Fathabad (also Romanized as Fatḩābād) is a village in Hulasu Rural District, in the Central District of Shahin Dezh County, West Azerbaijan Province, Iran. At the 2006 census, its population was 491, in 97 families.

References 

Populated places in Shahin Dezh County